The men's 20 kilometres walk event at the 2002 Asian Athletics Championships was held in Colombo, Sri Lanka on 10 August.

Results

References

2002 Asian Athletics Championships
Racewalking at the Asian Athletics Championships